Pre-industrial society refers to social attributes and forums of political and cultural organization that were prevalent before the advent of the Industrial Revolution, which occurred from 1750 to 1850. Pre-industrial refers to a time before there were machines and tools to help perform tasks en masse. Pre-industrial civilization dates back to centuries ago, but the main era known as the pre-industrial society occurred right before the industrial society. Pre-Industrial societies vary from region to region depending on the culture of a given area or history of social and political life. Europe was known for its feudal system and the Italian Renaissance.

The term "pre-industrial" is also used as a benchmark for environmental conditions before the development of industrial society: for example, the
Paris Agreement on Climate Change, adopted in Paris on 12 December, 2015 and in force from 4 November, 2016, "aims to limit global warming to well below 2, preferably to 1.5 degrees celsius, compared to pre-industrial levels." The date for the end of the "pre-industrial era" is not defined.

Common attributes

 Limited production
 Extreme agricultural economy
 Limited division of labor. In pre-industrial societies, production was relatively simple and the number of specialized crafts was limited.
 Limited variation of social classes
 Parochialism—Communications were limited between communities in pre-industrial societies. Few had the opportunity to see or hear beyond their own village. Industrial societies grew with the help of faster means of communication, having more information at hand about the world, allowing knowledge transfer and cultural diffusion between them.
 Populations grew at substantial rates 
 Social classes: peasants and lords
 Subsistence level of living
 Population dependent on peasants for food
 People were located in villages rather than in cities

Economic systems

 Hunter gather society
 Commodity market
 Mercantilism
 Subsistence agriculture
 Subsistence
 Primitive communism

Labor conditions

Social structure and working conditions
Harsh working conditions were prevalent long before the Industrial Revolution took place. Pre-industrial society was very static – child labour, dirty living conditions, and long working hours were not equally as prevalent before the Industrial Revolution.

See also
 Agrarian society
 Industrialisation
 Modernization theory
 Traditional society
 Dependency Theory
 Imperialism
 Hunter gatherers
 Transhumance
 Nomads
 Pastoral nomads
 Nomadic
 Post-industrial society
 Proto-industrialization

References

Bibliography 
 Grinin, L. 2007. Periodization of History: A theoretic-mathematical analysis. In: History & Mathematics. Ed. by Leonid Grinin, Victor de Munck, and Andrey Korotayev. Moscow: KomKniga/URSS. P.10-38. .

Sociological terminology
Industrial Revolution